Chung Hua Middle School No. 1 (informally CHMS1) is a Chinese Independent High School located in Kuching, Sarawak, Malaysia.  The school was established in 1958.  It is the oldest surviving Chinese Independent School in Sarawak and is also one of the 60 Chinese Independent High Schools in Malaysia.

The school has an enrolment of approximately 1700 students.  In 2013, the school has an enrolment of 460 new students.

Awards
 2015 Raffles Design Competition - Second Runner Up

External links
 

Schools in Sarawak
1958 establishments in Sarawak